White buffalo are bison (American buffalo) that are white in color, instead of the usual brown.  Several Native American religions consider them to be sacred signs.

White buffalo may also refer to:

Animals
 A white colored African buffalo
 A white colored water buffalo

People
 White Buffalo (chief) (1862–1929), chief of the Northern Cheyenne
 Francois Botha, South African boxer, nicknamed "The White Buffalo"

Arts, entertainment, and media

Fictional entities
 White Buffalo, from the video game Power Instinct
 White Buffalos, mascot of Madras High School in Madras, Oregon, United States

Music

Groups
 The White Buffalo (band), an Americana band
 The White Buffaloes, a rock band featuring Dave Graney

Songs
 "White Buffalo", a song by Cusco from the album Apurimac III
 "White Buffalo", a song by Running Wild from the album Pile of Skulls
 "The Great White Buffalo", a song by Saxon from the album Dogs of War
 "Great White Buffalo", a song by Ted Nugent and The Amboy Dukes from the album Tooth Fang & Claw

Television
 "Rin Tin Tin and the White Buffalo", a 1955 episode of the series The Adventures of Rin Tin Tin
 "White Buffalo", a season 9 episode of the series Walker, Texas Ranger

Other arts, entertainment, and media
 The White Buffalo (1977), a film starring Charles Bronson and Jack Warden
 White Buffalo Gazette, an Obscuro Comix & Art newsletter

Other uses
 White Buffalo Calf Woman, a figure in Lakota religion
 White Buffalo Cow Society, the most respected women's society amongst the Mandan and Hidatsa tribal peoples